Caroline Hamilton Pier Roehmer (September 18, 1870 – April 28, 1938) was an American lawyer.

Early life

Caroline Hamilton Pier was born in Fond du Lac, Wisconsin, on September 18, 1870. She was the second daughter of Colwert Kendall Pier and Kate Pier.

She was educated in the public schools of Fond du Lac and was graduated in the classical course of the high school, after studying music and other womanly subjects, until ready to enter the law school of the Wisconsin University. She enrolled in 1889, finishing the course in 1891 and receiving the degree of LL.B.

After law school, she briefly studied elocution at Northwestern University.

Career
She was admitted to the Wisconsin Bar in 1891 and joined the firm in Milwaukee, Wisconsin, of which her mother, Kate Pier, and two sisters, Kate Hamilton Pier and Harriet Hamilton Pier, were the other members.

She paid special attention to admiralty and maritime law and made it a specialty. In 1897, she was admitted to the bar of the United States Supreme Court.

Personal life

On November 17, 1897, Caroline Hamilton Pier married John Henry Roehmer (1865-1935), a lawyer and Yale graduate. The wedding was celebrated by her mother, Kate Pier, in her capacity of Court Commissioner. She had four children: Kate Pier Roehmer French (1897-1968), John Pier Roehmer (1901-1971), Dr. Edward Pier Roehmer (1908-1999) and James McIntosh Roehmer (1907-1908). John H. Roehmer taught at the University of Wisconsin and at Yale University and was instrumental in organizing the Wisconsin's street railway commission. He served on the State's Railroad Rate Commission and was general counsel for H.M. Byllesby & Co.

She and her husband lived in Milwaukee and Fond du Lac, but moved to Elmhurst, New York after he retired in 1931. She died on April 28, 1938 in Madison, Wisconsin.

References

1870 births
1938 deaths
People from Fond du Lac, Wisconsin
Wikipedia articles incorporating text from A Woman of the Century
19th-century American women lawyers
19th-century American lawyers